The rhino-horned lizard (Ceratophora stoddartii), also commonly known as Stoddart's unicorn lizard and  the mountain horned agama,  is a species of lizard in the family Agamidae. The species is endemic to Sri Lanka. It is called kagamuva angkatussa-කගමුව අං කටුස්සා in Sinhala.

Etymology
The specific name, stoddartii, is in honor of Charles Stoddart, who was a British army officer and diplomat.

Habitat and distribution
C. stoddartii is found widespread in montane forests of central Sri Lanka. Localities from which it has been recorded include Nuwara Eliya, Hakgala, Pattipola, Ohiya, Horton Plains, Hewaheta, Dimbula, Agarapathana, and Adam's Peak.

Description
The head of C. stoddartii is oval, and longer than wide. The rostral appendage is long, horn-like, about two thirds the length of the snout in males, but is reduced or even absent in females. The lamellae under the fourth toe number 23–27. The dorsum is brownish green or yellowish brown. The tail is marked with 10–16 dark brown crossbands. The venter is light brownish gray.

Ecology
When threatened, it opens its mouth wide, revealing the bright orange lining of the oral cavity.

The  presence  of  relatively  larger  trees  as  well  as  plants  with low to medium levels of DBH is an important factor for C. stoddartii which spends most of its time resting vertically on a tree  trunk  or  a  branch.  When  weather  conditions  are  too harsh  they  tend  to  take  refuge  inside  the  mosses  that  are abundant in the Cloud Forests. Tree  barks  with  different shades  (grays  and  browns)  and  mosaics  of  lichens  &  mosses provide the ideal background for C. stoddartii to merge with. Higher  perch  height  of  the  adult  males  can  be  assigned  as  a feature  of  territorial  defense  and  attracting  the  females.

The ground is less frequently used  by  adult C.  stoddartii except  for  the  occasional  hunting sprints to catch the escaping prey. However, it has been observed on  the  ground  feeding  on  caterpillars and  even  on  earth  worms (Pheretima  taprobenia).  When it  descends  to  the  ground  it changes its green and brown colors into more shades of brown and becomes well camouflaged with the leaf-litter.

Reproduction
C. stoddartii is oviparous. Egg laying takes place in July, and clutch size is about 2–5 eggs, each measuring 7.6-8.1 by 13.5–14.5 mm (.31 by .55 inch). The eggs are deposited in a hole, and hatch after 81–90 days. However, hatchlings have been founded in the wild also during colder months such as December and January. Hatchlings  which  emerge from  eggs  laid  in humus  or  among  leaf  litter  can be observed frequently occupying the ground where dead branch sticks and leaf litter well  camouflaged  them  from  the  possible  predators.

See also
Horton Plains National Park

References

External links
http://reptile-database.reptarium.cz/species?genus=Ceratophora&species=stoddartii
http://lankanaturesummary.blogspot.com/2014/02/ceratophora-stoddartii-rhino-horned.html

Further reading
Boulenger GA (1890). The Fauna of British India, Including Ceylon and Burma. Reptilia and Batrachia. London: Secretary of State for India in Council. (Taylor and Francis, printers). xviii + 541 pp. (Ceratophora stoddartii, p. 119).
Gray JE (1834). Illustrations of Indian Zoology; Chiefly Selected from the Collections of Major-General Hardwicke. Vol. II. London: Adolphus Richter. Plates 1-102. (Ceratophora stoddartii, new species, Plate 68, figure 2).
Günther ACLG (1864). The Reptiles of British India. London: The Ray Society. (Taylor and Francis, Printers). xxvii + 452 pp. + Plates I-XXVI. (Ceratophora stoddartii, p. 129 + Plate XIII, figures F, F',  F").
Smith MA (1935). The Fauna of British India, Including Ceylon and Burma. Reptilia and Amphibia. Vol. II.—Sauria. London: Secretary of State for India in Council. (Taylor and Francis, printers). xiii + 440 pp. + Plate I + 2 maps. ("Ceratophora stoddarti [sic]", pp. 152–153).

 Somaweera R and Somaweera N (2009). Lizards of Sri Lanka: a colour guide with field keys. Andreas S. Brahm, pp. 76–77.

Lizards of Asia
Reptiles of Sri Lanka
Reptiles described in 1834
Taxa named by John Edward Gray
Ceratophora